Smiley Face Killers: The Hunt for Justice is an American television docuseries that originally aired from January 19 to February 23, 2019 on Oxygen. It examines possible victims of the smiley-face murder theory. Produced by Alison Dammann, the six episodes focus on cases of young men who have disappeared and whose bodies are found in a body of water some time later.

Smiley-face graffiti has been found at most of the crime scenes, which is how the cases are connected. All deaths have been ruled as an undetermined or accidental drowning. The show seeks to look at these cases and find a connection to the smiley-face murder theory in hopes of reopening the cases and redefining the causes of death.

Summary 
The six episodes each focus on one victim, including information on the case prior to investigation, how the smiley face murder theory may apply to the case and the outcome of the investigation. All cases covered share some common factors: all victims were college-aged males who had disappeared after a night out with friends, whose bodies are found later in a body of water and whose deaths are ruled as accidental or undetermined drownings.

Retired police officials Kevin Gannon, Anthony Duarte and Dr. Lee Gilbertson lead the investigation with help from their team and locals in the victims' communities. Each episode typically includes an introduction to the case, interviews with the victim's family, the discovery of discrepancies in the case that may tie to the smiley-face murder theory and determination of a way to reopen the case or find additional answers. Most of the episodes do not conclude with a closed case, but rather expose the audience and investigators to new information that may support a new case or conclusion.

Investigators involved in the series 
The series' main investigators are Anthony Duarte and Kevin Gannon. Gannon is a retired New York Police Department sergeant and has received nearly 100 medals for bravery, being named one of the most highly valued members of the Special Investigation Division of the Detective Bureau and NYPD sergeants before he retired in 2001. Duarte is a retired U.S. Department of Homeland Security TSA security manager and NYPD second-grade detective. Duarte has been awarded ten Excellence in Police Duty awards and five commendations.

In addition to Gannon and Duarte, Mikey Donovan and D. Lee "Doc" Gilbertson are featured in some episodes. Donovan is a retired NYPD detective who was a first responder at the World Trade Center on 9/11 and specializes in interrogation. Gilbertson has a doctorate in sociology and a master's degree in criminal justice. Gilbertson is also employed at the National Gang Crime Research Center and is an executive editor for the Journal of Gang Research.

Episodes

References

External links 

2019 American television series debuts
2019 American television series endings
Oxygen (TV channel) original programming
True crime television series